"Duffle Bag Boy" is the debut single by American hip hop duo Playaz Circle featuring Lil Wayne, released as the lead single from the former's debut album, Supply & Demand (2007). The song was produced by M16 and Liam Kantwill. The song peaked at number 15, reaching in the Top 40 of the U.S. Billboard Hot 100.

Music video
The music video was directed by Disturbing Tha Peace CEO Chaka Zulu. It begins with Tity Boi (aka 2 Chainz) getting up from bed for breakfast. He gets dressed and rides in a Lamborghini Gallardo, in which he picks up Lil Wayne, handing him a duffle bag. They then head to a concert. Meanwhile, Dolla Boy sells some CDs to a boy in exchange for a duffle bag, then receives a text message to meet Tity Boi and Lil Wayne. At the end of the video, all three of them are seen performing together.

Remix versions
The official remix features rappers Birdman, Juelz Santana and a new verse from Lil Wayne (who only sang the song's chorus in the original version). At the 2007 BET Hip Hop Awards, Playaz Circle and Lil Wayne performed the song with a new guest verse from fellow rapper and DTP label-boss Ludacris.

Miami-based rapper Lil' Brianna, released a freestyle over the song's instrumental for her 2007 mixtape, Princess of Miami. UK rapper Kano, released a freestyle over the song's instrumental for his MC No. 1 mixtape. Other remixes include the Travis Barker and Sean P remixes. American rappers Rick Ross and Young Jeezy also have their own respective remixes.

In other media
The song was used by American comedian/actor Chris Rock as the music he exited the stage to on his 2008 "No Apologies" tour, as well as his entrance theme song to his show "Kill the Messenger". 

Canadian rapper/singer Drake uses Lil Wayne's lyrics of "Duffle Bag Boy" for his song "Underground Kings" from his second studio album Take Care.

Charts

Weekly charts

Year-end charts

Certifications

References

External links
 

2007 songs
2007 debut singles
Lil Wayne songs
Songs written by 2 Chainz
Songs written by Lil Wayne
Def Jam Recordings singles
Trap music songs